Greatest Hits: The Platinum Collection is a compilation album by American singer-songwriter Barry Manilow, released in 1993. All of the compilation's songs had been previously released, with the exception of the 1993 remixes of "Could It Be Magic" and "I'm Your Man".

Track listing

Charts

Certifications

References

1993 greatest hits albums
Barry Manilow compilation albums
Arista Records compilation albums